Dorkovo is a rural locality (a village) in Leskovskoye Rural Settlement, Vologodsky District, Vologda Oblast, Russia. The population was 2 as of 2002.

Geography 
Dorkovo is located 17 km southwest of Vologda (the district's administrative centre) by road. Spirino is the nearest rural locality.

References 

Rural localities in Vologodsky District